The slaty-backed chat-tyrant or chestnut-bellied chat-tyrant (Ochthoeca cinnamomeiventris) is a species of bird in the tyrant flycatcher family. It is found in Bolivia, Colombia, Ecuador, Peru, and Venezuela. Its natural habitats are subtropical or tropical moist montane forests and heavily degraded former forest.

The slaty-backed chat-tyrant was formerly treated as conspecific with the blackish chat-tyrant (Ochthoeca nigrita) and the maroon-belted chat-tyrant (Ochthoeca thoracica).

References

Updates to Birds of the World: A Checklist by James F. Clements. Fifth Edition. 2000.
García-Moreno, Jaime, Peter Arctander and Jon Fjeldså. 1998. Pre-Pleistocene Differentiation Among Chat-Tyrants. The Condor 100:629-640

slaty-backed chat-tyrant
Birds of the Northern Andes
slaty-backed chat-tyrant
Taxonomy articles created by Polbot